Bill Barry (7 February 1899 – 12 December 1955) was  a former Australian rules footballer who played with Collingwood in the Victorian Football League (VFL).

Notes

External links 

		
Bill Barry's profile at Collingwood Forever

1899 births
1955 deaths
Australian rules footballers from Victoria (Australia)
Collingwood Football Club players